St. John's Hospital is an acute general voluntary hospital located in the city of Limerick, County Limerick, Ireland. St. John's Hospital is governed and managed independently by its own hospital board in accordance with its constitution. Although it is independently managed, St. John's Hospital is one of six hospitals that form UL Hospitals Group.

History
The hospital, founded by Lady Lucy Hartstonge, was built on the site of an old barracks and opened as the Fever Hospital of Saint John in 1781. The Sisters of the Little Company of Mary took over the management of the hospital in 1888. The emergency department was replaced by a minor injuries unit in 2013.

References

Further reading

External links

1781 establishments in Ireland
Hospitals in County Limerick
Hospitals established in the 1780s
Health Service Executive hospitals